Newton Smith "Bucky" Jacobs (March 21, 1913 – June 15, 1990) was a Major League Baseball pitcher who played for three seasons. He played for the Washington Senators for 11 games during the 1937 Washington Senators season, then for 11 combined games in 1939 and 1940. He played college baseball at the University of Richmond.

External links

1913 births
1990 deaths
Major League Baseball pitchers
Baseball players from Virginia
Washington Senators (1901–1960) players
Richmond Spiders baseball players
People from Altavista, Virginia